Bard-e Karkhaneh (also Romanized as Bard-e Kārkhāneh; also known as Bar-e Kārkhāneh) is a village in Milas Rural District, in the Central District of Lordegan County, Chaharmahal and Bakhtiari Province, Iran. At the 2006 census, its population was 71, in 16 families.

References 

Populated places in Lordegan County